Candied fruit, also known as glacé fruit, is whole fruit, smaller pieces of fruit, or pieces of peel, placed in heated sugar syrup, which absorbs the moisture from within the fruit and eventually preserves it. Depending on the size and type of fruit, this process of preservation can take from several days to several months. This process allows the fruit to remain edible for up to a year. It has existed since the 14th century.

The continual process of drenching the fruit in syrup causes the fruit to become saturated with sugar, preventing the growth of spoilage microorganisms due to the resulting unfavourable osmotic pressure.

Fruits which are commonly candied include cherries, pineapple, greengages, pears, peaches and melon, as well as ginger root. The principal candied peels are orange and citron; these, together with candied lemon peel, are the usual ingredients of mixed chopped peel. Candied vegetables are also made, from vegetables such as pumpkin, turnip and carrot.

Recipes vary from region to region, but the general principle is to boil the fruit, steep it in increasingly stronger sugar solutions for a number of weeks, and then dry off any remaining water.

Uses 
As well as being eaten as snacks, candied fruits such as cherries and candied peels are commonly used in fruitcakes or pancakes.

See also

References 

Confectionery
Food preservation